Sabrina Jonnier (born 19 August 1981) is a French former professional downhill mountain biker. She won the general classification of the UCI Downhill World Cup five times: in 2003, 2005, 2007, 2009 and 2010. She was also the world downhill champion in 2006 and 2007, in addition to four second-place finishes.

She retired in 2012 after the national championships, largely due to a recent crash sustained while practicing for the World Cup event in Pietermaritzburg, South Africa.

References

External links

1981 births
Living people
French female cyclists
Downhill mountain bikers
Sportspeople from Hyères
French mountain bikers
UCI Mountain Bike World Champions (women)
Cyclists from Provence-Alpes-Côte d'Azur
20th-century French women
21st-century French women